Jan Weinzierl (born 1 May 1973) is a former professional tennis player from Germany.

Biography
Weinzierl, a right-handed player, grew up in Biberach an der Riss. A winner of 11 Futures titles, he has beaten Nikolay Davydenko in Futures tournaments on three occasions and also has a win over Jo Wilfried Tsonga. He played his first Challenger tournament in 1994 and finished runner-up at Challengers twice in his career, at Campos Do Jordao and Sopot. His two ATP Tour main draw appearance came eight years apart. In 1995 he lost in the final round of qualifying at the Seoul Open but entered the draw as a lucky loser, where he was beaten in the first round by Paul Wekesa. He featured as a lucky loser again when he played at the 2003 International Raiffeisen Grand Prix in Sankt Pölten and lost in the first round to Irakli Labadze in three sets.

References

External links
 
 

1973 births
Living people
German male tennis players
People from Biberach an der Riss
Sportspeople from Tübingen (region)
Tennis people from Baden-Württemberg